Wimmers is an Australian soft drink brand founded in Nambour, Australia in 1910 by Alfred Wimmer and his son Frank. Wimmers is currently owned by Noosa Beverages Pty Ltd through the partnership of Peter and Toni Lavin, Mark Thompson and Sharon Andersen.

References

External links

Drink companies of Australia
Companies based in Queensland
Australian companies established in 1910
Soft drinks manufacturers
Food and drink companies established in 1910